The Netherlands national hockey team may refer to:

 Netherlands men's national field hockey team
 Netherlands women's national field hockey team
 Netherlands men's national ice hockey team
 Netherlands men's national junior ice hockey team
 Netherlands men's national under-18 ice hockey team
 Netherlands women's national ice hockey team
 Netherlands national roller hockey team